Mieczysław Niedziałkowski (September 19, 1893 in Vilnius - June 21, 1940 in Palmiry) was a Polish politician and writer. He was an activist in the Polish Socialist Party, editor in chief of Robotnik, and one of the primary activists and cofounders of the Centrolew alliance. He published several works on socialism and Polish politics. He took part in the  defence of Warsaw in 1939, organizing the volunteer militias. He was subsequently arrested and interrogated by the Gestapo. He was executed on 21 June 1940 in Palmiry during the German AB-Aktion.

After his arrest by the Gestapo. Niedziałkowski was personally interviewed by Heinrich Himmler, who asked "What do you want from us; what do you expect?" Niedziałkowski responded "From you I neither want nor demand anything. With you I fight."

References

Further reading
 Niemyski St., W redakcji "Robotnika" w: PPS. Wspomnienia z lat 1918–1939, Warszawa 1987
 Woszczyńska St., O Mieczysławie Niedziałkowskim w: PPS. Wspomnienia z lat 1918–1939, Warszawa 1987

1893 births
1940 deaths
Politicians from Vilnius
Polish Socialist Party politicians
Polish people of World War II
Members of the Executive of the Labour and Socialist International